Khwaja Muhammad Azam Kaul Didamari (died 1765) was a Sufi Kashmiri writer in the Persian language. Khawaja means "master", Kaul is a surname meaning pundit, Didamari means from the Didamar quarter of Srinagar.

His history entitled Waqiat-i-Kashmir (The Story of Kashmir), also known after the writer's name as Tarikh-i-Azami (History by Azam), was published in Persian in 1747. Urdu translations were published by Munshi Ashraf Ali (Delhi, 1846), and Khwaja Hamid Yazdani (Jammu, 1988). After his death his son Khwaja Muhammad Aslam added to the work with his Gauhar-i-Alam (Jewels of the World).

References

18th-century Persian-language writers
1765 deaths
18th-century Indian historians
Sufi poets
People from Srinagar
Year of birth unknown
Scholars from Jammu and Kashmir